39 Squadron or 39th Squadron may refer to:

 No. 39 Squadron RAF, a unit of the United Kingdom Royal Air Force
 39th Airlift Squadron (United States), a unit of the United States Air Force
 39th Information Operations Squadron (United States), a unit of the United States Air Force
 Marine Aviation Logistics Squadron 39, a unit of the United States Marine Corps

See also
 39th Division (disambiguation)
 39th Brigade (disambiguation)
 39th Regiment (disambiguation)
 39th Battalion (disambiguation)